The 1995–96 North Carolina Tar Heels men's basketball team represented University of North Carolina. The head coach was Dean Smith. The team played its home games in Chapel Hill, North Carolina, and was a member of the Atlantic Coast Conference.

Roster

Schedule and results

|-
!colspan=12 style=| Regular season

|-
!colspan=12 style=| ACC Tournament

|-
!colspan=12 style=| NCAA Tournament

NCAA basketball tournament
East
North Carolina 83, New Orleans 62
Texas Tech 92, North Carolina 73

Rankings

Team players drafted into the NBA

References

North Carolina
North Carolina Tar Heels men's basketball seasons
Tar
Tar
North Carolina